The 2020 Silverstone FIA Formula 2 round was a pair of motor races involving Formula 2 cars that took place on 1 and 2 August 2020 at the Silverstone Circuit in Silverstone, Great Britain. The event is the fourth round of the 2020 FIA Formula 2 Championship and ran in support of the 2020 British Grand Prix.

Classification

Qualifying

Feature Race

Sprint race

Standings after the event

Drivers' Championship standings

Teams' Championship standings

 Note: Only the top five positions are included for both sets of standings.

See also 
2020 British Grand Prix
2020 Silverstone Formula 3 round

References

External links 

Silverstone